PIMCO (Pacific Investment Management Company, LLC) is an American investment management firm focusing on active fixed income management worldwide. PIMCO manages investments in many asset classes such as fixed income, equities, commodities, asset allocation, ETFs, hedge funds, and private equity. PIMCO is one of the largest investment managers, actively managing more than $2 trillion in assets for central banks, sovereign wealth funds, pension funds, corporations, foundations and endowments, and individual investors around the world. PIMCO’s headquarters are in Newport Beach, California; the firm has over 3,100 employees working in 22 offices throughout the Americas, Europe, and Asia.

History 

PIMCO initially functioned as a unit of Pacific Life Insurance Co., managing separate accounts for that insurer's clients. The firm was founded in 1971, launching with $12 million of assets. In 2000, PIMCO was acquired by Allianz SE, a large global financial services company based in Munich, Germany, but the firm continues to operate as an autonomous subsidiary of Allianz.

On September 26, 2014, it was announced that Bill Gross, co-founder and former Chief Investment Officer (dubbed the "Bond King" in the investment arena), was stepping down to join Janus Capital Group. In April 2015, PIMCO announced the hire of former Federal Reserve Chairman Dr. Ben Bernanke as a senior advisor, following in the footsteps of predecessor Federal Reserve Chairman Alan Greenspan.

Leadership 
PIMCO appointed Emmanuel Roman as CEO effective November 1, 2016. He succeeded Douglas M. Hodge, who was CEO from 2014 to 2016.

Dan Ivascyn, group chief investment officer (CIO) broadly oversees portfolio management and investment strategy. There are also five other CIOs: Andrew Balls, CIO Global Fixed Income; Mark Kiesel, CIO Global Credit; Scott Mather, CIO U.S. Core Strategies; Marc Seidner, CIO Non-traditional Strategies; and Mihir Worah, CIO Real Return and Asset Allocation.

Roman was awarded the Chicago Booth Distinguished Alumni Award in 2019 in recognition of outstanding professional achievement.

Ivascyn was inducted into the Fixed Income Hall of Fame in 2019 which recognizes leaders and pioneers who have transformed capital markets and established enduring legacies.

Awards

2019
The Civic 50 Award by Points of Light.
Outstanding ESG Investment Leader of the Year by Scott Mather, Environmental Finance.
Innovation Award by Impact 2030.

2020
 Best Place to Work for LGBTQ Equality by Human Rights Campaign.

2021

2021 Money Management Fund Manager of the Year Global Fixed Income award with the winning fund Global Bond Wholesale

References

External links

 
 Pacific Investment Management Company LLC Company Profile—Yahoo! Finance
 PIMCO to focus on global funds—Bloomberg News
 "Inside the Showdown Atop PIMCO"—The Wall Street Journal

 
1971 establishments in California
2000 mergers and acquisitions
American companies established in 1971
Companies based in Newport Beach, California
Exchange-traded funds
Financial services companies based in California
Financial services companies established in 1971
Investment management companies of the United States